Terrence Fede (born November 19, 1991) is a former American football defensive end. He was drafted by the Miami Dolphins in the seventh round of the 2014 NFL Draft. He played college football at Marist.

Early years
Fede was born to Haitian parents in Nyack, New York. Fede attended Nyack High School in Upper Nyack, New York, where he was a dual athlete playing football and basketball.

College career 
Fede was the first player from Marist College to be drafted. Fede totaled 13 sacks his senior season, and 31 for his college career.
2013: PFL Defensive Player of the Year, First Team All-PFL, 6th in voting for Buck Buchanan Award, selected All-American by five separate outlets, two-time PFL Defensive Player of the Week. Totaled 13 sacks, and led the FCS in sacks per game. ... Broke program records for sacks in a season (13) and career (30.5). ... First player in program history to win major award from the PFL.   

2012: First Team All-PFL, PFL Defensive Player of the Week (Nov. 18). Led team in sacks (nine) and tackles for loss (12.5). ... Tied for fourth in tackles with 63 (28 solo). ... Added 22 quarterback hurries, three pass break-ups, a fumble recovery and a blocked kick. ... Had three games with more than one sack, including three at Campbell, Nov. 17. ... Had 10 tackles vs. Dayton, Nov. 10.

2011: Second Team All-PFL, PFL Co-Defensive Player of the Week (Oct. 30). Led team with 8.5 sacks and 16 tackles for loss. ... Finished second on team with 72 tackles (27 solo). ... Registered a forced fumble, a fumble recovery, a blocked kick, and two pass break-ups.

Professional career

Miami Dolphins
Fede was drafted by the Miami Dolphins in the seventh round, 234th overall, in the 2014 NFL Draft. On December 21, 2014, Fede blocked a punt forcing a safety to win the game against the Minnesota Vikings. Fede was an occasional starter during his tenure with Miami. 
On December 21, 2014, Fede blocked a punt for a safety with 41 seconds left to break a tie and give his Miami Dolphins 37-35 victory over the Minnesota Viking. It was the latest point in a game in NFL history that a safety proved to be the winning margin.  
On October 28, 2016, Fede, along with Senior Vice Presidents Nat Moore and Jason Jenkins and Dolphins staff flew to Port-au-Prince, Haiti to deliver medical supplies, safe water solutions and generators to help rebuild homes. The visit was arranged in conjunction with the City of North Miami and the North Miami Police Department.

Buffalo Bills
On April 4, 2018, Fede signed with the Buffalo Bills. He was released on September 1, 2018.

New York Giants 
On August 3, 2019, Fede was signed by the New York Giants. He was waived on August 31, 2019 during the pre-season roster cuts.

References

1991 births
Living people
American football defensive ends
American sportspeople of Haitian descent
Buffalo Bills players
Marist Red Foxes football players
Miami Dolphins players
New York Giants players
People from Nyack, New York
Players of American football from New York (state)
Sportspeople from the New York metropolitan area
Nyack High School alumni